Mirzahid Farmonov (29 February 1988, Qashqadaryo) is a Uzbekistani judoka. At the 2012 Summer Olympics he competed in the Men's 66 kg, but was defeated in the second round.

References

External links
 
 

Uzbekistani male judoka
Living people
Olympic judoka of Uzbekistan
Judoka at the 2012 Summer Olympics
Asian Games medalists in judo
Judoka at the 2010 Asian Games
Judoka at the 2014 Asian Games
Asian Games silver medalists for Uzbekistan
Asian Games bronze medalists for Uzbekistan
Medalists at the 2010 Asian Games
Medalists at the 2014 Asian Games
1988 births
People from Qashqadaryo Region
21st-century Uzbekistani people